Landiona is a comune (municipality) in the Province of Novara in the Italian region Piedmont, located about  northeast of Turin and about  northwest of Novara.

Landiona borders the following municipalities: Arborio, Mandello Vitta, Sillavengo, and Vicolungo.

Demographic evolution

References

External links
 www.comune.landiona.no.it/

Cities and towns in Piedmont